Sebaihi is a surname. Notable people with the surname include:

 Billal Sebaihi (born 1992), French footballer
 Sabrina Sebaihi (born 1981), French politician

See also
 Sekai no Hito e